BBC Radio 2 Eurovision was a pop-up DAB service from the BBC which launched at 12 noon on Thursday 8 May 2014. The station continued to broadcast for 12 hours each day until Sunday 11 May 2014. The station returned at noon on Thursday 21 May 2015 and continued to broadcast until 10pm on 24 May 2015.

The station's programming mainly concentrated on the history and culture of the Eurovision Song Contest, as well as providing a more comprehensive coverage of the annual festival for Eurovision fans.

Presenters 
 Paddy O'Connell
 Graham Norton
 Sir Terry Wogan
 Ken Bruce
 Michael Ball
 Maria McErlane
 Brian Matthew
 Tony Blackburn
 Johnnie Walker
 Sara Cox
 Scott Mills
 Ana Matronic

See also 

 BBC Radio 2 Country
 BBC Music Jazz
 BBC Radio 2 50s

References

External links 
 
 
 Media UK's BBC Radio 2 site including scheduled programming

 
Eurovision
Radio stations established in 2014
Digital-only radio stations
Defunct radio stations in the United Kingdom
Adult contemporary radio stations in the United Kingdom
United Kingdom in the Eurovision Song Contest
2014 establishments in the United Kingdom
Radio stations disestablished in 2015
2015 disestablishments in the United Kingdom